also known by  and his Chinese style name , was a bureaucrat of Ryukyu Kingdom.

King Shō Iku dispatched a gratitude envoy for his taking power to Edo, Japan in 1832. However, Prince Tomigusuku died in Kagoshima; Futenma Chōten (also known by Kanegusuku Chōten) served as the political decoy of the prince, took the title "Prince Tomigusuku", and went to Edo. They sailed back in the next year.

He served as a member of sanshikan from 1836 to 1839.

References

1839 deaths
Ueekata
Sanshikan
People of the Ryukyu Kingdom
Ryukyuan people
19th-century Ryukyuan people